Goldenbridge is a stop on the Luas light-rail tram system in Dublin, Ireland.  It opened in 2004 as a stop on the Red Line.  The stop is located next to a lock on a section of track which runs alongside the Grand Canal, near Goldenbridge Cemetery.

The area is named for the Golden Bridge (formerly Glydon Bridge) which carries Emmett Road over the River Camac, some 800m away from the Luas stop.

The stop includes a level bridge crossing the lock, allowing access to nearby areas on the north side of the canal.

The stop is also served by Dublin Bus route 123.

Goldenbridge is intended to be a stop on the proposed Luas line to Lucan.

References

Luas Red Line stops in Dublin (city)